The Women's Triple Jump event at the 2005 World Championships in Athletics was held at the Helsinki Olympic Stadium on August 6 and August 7.

Medalists

Qualification

Heat 1
  Yargelis Savigne, Cuba 14.47m Q
  Magdelín Martínez, Italy 14.46m Q
  Anna Pyatykh, Russia 14.46m Q
  Viktoriya Gurova, Russia 14.38m Q
  Yamilé Aldama, Sudan 14.36m Q
  Baya Rahouli, Algeria 14.17m q
  Natallia Safronava, Belarus 14.09m
  Anastasiya Zhuravleva, Uzbekistan 13.97m
  Dana Veldáková, Slovakia 13.84m
  Natalia Kilpeläinen, Finland 13.66m
  Tetyana Dyachenko, Ukraine 13.32m
  Athanasia Perra, Greece NM
  Yelena Parfenova, Kazakhstan NM
  Françoise Mbango Etone, Cameroon DNS

Heat 2
  Hrysopiyi Devetzi, Greece 14.72m Q (SB)
  Trecia Smith, Jamaica 14.69m Q
  Qiuyan Huang, China 14.22m q
  Carlota Castrejana, Spain 14.20m q
  Tatyana Lebedeva, Russia 14.15m q
  Kene Ndoye, Senegal 14.11m q
  Simona la Mantia, Italy 14.00m
  Snežana Vukmirovic, Slovenia 13.88m
  Mabel Gay, Cuba 13.83m
  Mariya Dimitrova, Bulgaria 13.79m
  Nadezhda Bazhenova, Russia 13.78m
  Šárka Kašparkova, Czech Republic 13.69m
  Erica McLain, United States 13.29m

Final
  Trecia Smith, Jamaica 15.11m (WL)
  Yargelis Savigne, Cuba 14.82m (PB)
  Anna Pyatykh, Russia 14.78m
  Yamilé Aldama, Sudan 14.72m (SB)
  Hrysopiyi Devetzi, Greece 14.64m
  Kene Ndoye, Senegal 14.47m (SB)
  Baya Rahouli, Algeria 14.50m
  Magdelín Martínez, Italy 14.31m
  Qiuyan Huang, China 14.21m
  Viktoriya Gurova, Russia 13.96
  Carlota Castrejana, Spain 13.86
  Tatyana Lebedeva, Russia DNS

External links
IAAF results, heats
IAAF results, final

Triple jump
Triple jump at the World Athletics Championships
2005 in women's athletics